The Preserve at Sharp Mountain (also called The Sharp Mountain Preserve) is a nature-based community located near Jasper, Georgia in Pickens County. It is one of three mountain communities in Pickens County, and the only one dedicated to maintaining its natural amenities. The Preserve at Sharp Mountain was named the "Best Community for Outdoor Lovers" by Pinnacle Living magazine,  Unlike many planned communities, the Preserve at Sharp Mountain does not have swimming pools and tennis courts with club houses or golf courses. Instead, the Preserve at Sharp Mountain offers many acres of green space, hiking and nature trails, a nature pavilion, waterfalls, a bird sanctuary, a butterfly garden and various nature parks. The community is gated to restrict use of its  of privately owned roads to those living in the community. The Preserve at Sharp Mountain was developed by Four Seasons originally, which later became Naterra Land. Naterra's stated goal in all of its projects is "to better connect people with nature." Naterra Land sold out all of its inventory in the Preserve, and control of the community is now governed by a Property Owners' Association (POA). In 2011, the Preserve Association switched from being an HOA (Home Owners' Association) to being a POA (Property Owners' Association), each being viewed differently under Georgia law. In 2008 the Preserve became a recognized member of the national Firewise  communities program and is one of the 13 in Georgia.

Location and environment

The community is in the foothills of the Blue Ridge Mountains, and offers  panoramic views. The city of Atlanta can be seen on the horizon from Sharp Mountain ( MSL @ LAT 34.43898, LON -84.506873) and Tally Mountain ( MSL @ LAT 34.453723, LON -84.492457).  The climate is that of a temperate southeastern forest. Flora includes red and white oak families, tulip poplar, maple, dogwood, and at the higher elevations, sourwood trees. Wild turkeys, fox, bobcat, deer, various species of hawks and owls, golden eagles, and an occasional black bear live within the community.

Proximity
Residents of the Preserve are an approximately ten minutes drive away from the Jasper business district and seven minutes from the Piedmont Mountainside Hospital. North Georgia is also "wine country," and hosts a number of large wineries, one of which, is immediately adjacent to the Preserve on the southeast corner. The Sharp Mountain Vineyards produces approximately 11 tons annually with winery capacity of 800 cases per year. It has won several awards for its wines and is a popular stop on the yearly Georgia wine tour.

Amenities
Community Features include:
 Acreage:  encompassing parts of Sharp Mountain, Tally Mountain, and Henderson Mountain.
 Density: Zoned to allow no less than  lots.
 Recreation: Hiking and biking trails, a bird sanctuary, wildlife feeding area, and 8 nature parks
 Parks: 8 different parks, each featuring gazebos, barbecues, playgrounds, native plant gardens, rock and hewn wood tables, and an open-air lodge and formal lawn.
 Infrastructure: Private gated community with 12 miles of wide paved roads, underground utilities with high speed DSL.
 Structures and Protections: Community has covenants and architectural guidelines.
 Security: Gated entrance with security cameras.

Homesites

All of the land within The Preserve at Sharp Mountain is owned by individual entities and the developer is no longer selling lots, although lots and homes do come onto the market from time to time. Of the approximately 312 lots within the community, in 2022 about 146 had either been built upon, in process, or approved to begin construction. Several homes have private swimming pools and some are dedicated to equestrian pursuits. All homesites are serviced by private individual deep wells and power from Amicalola Electric Membership Corporation (EMC).

References

External links
Preserve real estate video

Neighborhoods in Georgia (U.S. state)
Unincorporated communities in Pickens County, Georgia
Unincorporated communities in Georgia (U.S. state)